Lesticus wittmeri is a species of ground beetle in the subfamily Pterostichinae. It was described by Morvan in 1980.

References

Lesticus
Beetles described in 1980